Trachylepis infralineata is a species of skink found on Europa Island.

References

Trachylepis
Reptiles described in 1913
Taxa named by Oskar Boettger